Potomac School may refer to:

 Potomac School (Potomac, Montana), listed on the NRHP in Montana
 Potomac School (McLean, Virginia)

See also
 Potomac High School (disambiguation)